

The U.S. state of West Virginia is divided into fifty-five counties, each of which is further subdivided into magisterial districts.  The U.S. Census Bureau defines these districts as non-functioning subdivisions used for various purposes, such as conducting elections, apportioning county officials from different areas, recording land ownership, assessing property taxes, and collecting vital statistics.  Magisterial districts possess no governmental organization or authority.

After attaining independence from Virginia in 1863, West Virginia's counties were divided into civil townships, with the goal of placing authority in the hands of local governments.  However, township government proved impractical across the heavily rural state, with citizens unable to meet on a regular basis, and inadequate tax revenue to meet township responsibilities.  Following the adoption of the Constitution of West Virginia in 1872, the townships were converted into magisterial districts, and the county courts (later county commissions) empowered to establish, consolidate, or otherwise modify them.

Each county shall be laid off by the county court into magisterial districts, not less than three nor more than ten in number, and as nearly equal as may be in territory and population. The districts as they now exist shall remain until changed by the county court. The county court may, from time to time, increase or diminish the number of such districts, and change the boundary lines thereof as necessity may require, in order to conform the same to the provisions of the Constitution of the State.

The only state other than West Virginia to use magisterial districts as a minor civil division of its counties is Virginia, which like West Virginia initially established a system of civil townships, in its Constitution of 1870.  These were replaced by magisterial districts in 1874.

For most of the state's history, there were three hundred and fifty magisterial districts in West Virginia, an average of six districts per county.  Greenbrier, Harrison, Mason, Ohio, and Wood Counties each contained ten districts, the maximum number provided for by state law.  Brooke, Grant, and Hancock were the only counties with the minimum number of three.  Twenty-four different counties included a Union District, thirteen had districts named after Ulysses S. Grant, and nine counties each had districts named for George Washington and Henry Clay.

Beginning in the 1970s, many counties combined or consolidated their original magisterial districts in order to equalize their area and population, creating districts that were fewer in number, but larger in area.  This created confusion with county land and tax records, in response to which the legislature provided for the establishment of tax districts following the former magisterial district lines, as they existed on January 1, 1969.  In these counties, the new magisterial districts are used only for the allocation of county officials, and the collection of census data; the former magisterial districts continue to exist in the form of tax districts.

A List of the current and former magisterial districts of West Virginia, sorted by county:

Barbour County

Current

 North

 South

 West

Historic

 Barker
 Cove
 Elk

 Glade
 Philippi
 Pleasant

 Union
 Valley

Berkeley County

Current

 Adam Stephens
 Norborne

 Potomac
 Shenandoah

 Tuscarora
 Valley

Historic

 Arden
 Falling Water
 Gerardstown

 Hedgesville
 Martinsburg
 Mill Creek

 Opequon

Boone County

Current

 District 1

 District 2

 District 3

Historic

 Crook
 Peytona

 Scott
 Sherman

 Washington

Braxton County

Current

 Eastern
 Northern

 Southern

 Western

Historic

 Birch
 Holly

 Kanawha
 Otter

 Salt Lick

Brooke County

Current

 Follansbee

 Weirton

 Wellsburg

Historic

 Buffalo

 Cross Creek

Cabell County

Current

 District 1
 District 2

 District 3
 District 4

 District 5

Historic

 Barboursville
 Gideon
 Grant

 Guyandotte
 Kyle
 McComas

 Union

Calhoun County

Current

 District 1
 District 2

 District 3
 District 4

 District 5

Historic

 Center
 Lee

 Sheridan
 Sherman

 Washington

Clay County

Current

 District A

 District B

 District C

Historic

 Buffalo
 Henry

 Otter
 Pleasant

 Union

Doddridge County

Current

 Beech
 Maple

 Oak

 Pine

Historic

 Central
 Cove
 Grant

 Greenbrier
 McClellan
 New Milton

 Southwest
 West Union

Fayette County

Current

 New Haven

 Plateau

 Valley

Historic

 Falls
 Fayetteville
 Kanawha

 Mountain Cove
 Nuttall
 Quinnimont

 Sewell Mountain

Gilmer County

Current

 Center
 City

 De Kalb-Troy

 Glenville

Historic

 De Kalb

 Troy

Grant County

 Grant

 Milroy

 Union

Greenbrier County

Current

 Central

 Eastern

 Western

Historic

 Anthony's Creek
 Big Levels
 Blue Sulphur

 Falling Spring
 Fort Spring
 Frankford

 Irish Corner
 Lewisburg
 Meadow Bluff

 White Sulphur
 Williamsburg

Hampshire County

 Bloomery
 Capon
 Gore

 Mill Creek
 Romney
 Sherman

 Springfield

Hancock County

Current

 Butler

 Clay

 Grant

Historic

 Poe

Hardy County

 Capon
 Lost River

 Moorefield
 Old Fields

 South Fork

Harrison County

Current

Eastern
Northern

North Urban
Southern

South Urban
Southwest

Historic

 Clark
 Clay
 Coal

 Eagle
 Elk
 Grant

 Sardis
 Simpson
 Southeast

 Suburban
 Tenmile
 Union

Jackson County

Current

 Eastern

 Northern

 Western

Historic

 Grant
 Ravenswood

 Ripley
 Union

 Washington

Jefferson County

Current

 Charles Town
 Harpers Ferry

 Kabletown
 Middleway

 Shepherdstown

Historic

 Bolivar

 Potomac

 Shepherd

Kanawha County

Current

 District 1

 District 2

 District 3

 District 4

Historic

 Big Sandy
 Cabin Creek
 Elk

 Jefferson
 Loudon
 Malden

 Poca
 Union
 Washington

 District 5
 District 6

Lewis County

Current

Courthouse-Collins Settlement

Freemans Creek

Hackers Creek-Skin Creek

Historic

 Collins Settlement
 Court House

 Hackers Creek

 Skin Creek

Lincoln County

Current

 District 1

 District 2

 District 3

Historic

 Carroll
 Duval
 Harts Creek

 Jefferson
 Laurel Hill
 Sheridan

 Union
 Washington

Logan County

Current

 Central

 Eastern

 Western

Historic

 Buffalo
 Chapmanville
 East

 Guyan
 Hardee
 Island Creek

 Lee
 Logan
 Magnolia

 Northwest
 Triadelphia
 West

Marion County

Current

 Middletown

 Palatine

 West Augusta

Historic

 Fairmont
 Grant
 Lincoln

 Mannington
 Paw Paw
 Union

 Winfield

Marshall County

Current

 District 1

 District 2

 District 3

Historic

 Cameron
 Clay
 Franklin

 Liberty
 Meade
 Sand Hill

 Union
 Washington
 Webster

Mason County

 Arbuckle
 Clendenin
 Cologne

 Cooper
 Graham
 Hannan

 Lewis
 Robinson
 Union

 Waggener

McDowell County

Current

 Big Creek
 Browns Creek

 North Elkin

 Sandy River

Historic

 Adkin

 Elk

 North Fork

Mercer County

Current

 District I

 District II

 District III

Historic

 Beaver Pond
 East River

 Jumping Branch
 Plymouth

 Rock

Mineral County

Current

 District 1

 District 2

 District 3

Historic

 Cabin Run
 Elk

 Frankfort
 New Creek

 Piedmont
 Welton

Mingo County

Current

 Beech Ben Mate
 Kermit Harvey
 Lee

 Magnolia
 Stafford

 Tug Hardee
 Williamson

Historic

 Hardee
 Harvey

 Kermit

 Tug River

Monongalia County

Current

 Central

 Eastern

 Western

Historic

 Battelle
 Cass
 Clay

 Clinton
 Grant
 Morgan

 Union

Monroe County

Current

 Central

 Eastern

 Western

Historic

 Forest Hill
 Red Sulphur
 Second Creek

 Springfield
 Sweet Springs

 Union
 Wolf Creek

Morgan County

Current

 District 1

 District 2

 District 3

Historic

 Allen
 Bath
 Cacapon

 Rock Gap
 Sleepy Creek
 Timber Ridge

 District 4

Nicholas County

 Beaver
 Grant
 Hamilton

 Jefferson
 Kentucky
 Summersville

 Wilderness

Ohio County

Current

 District 1

 District 2

 District 3

Historic

 Center
 Clay
 Liberty

 Madison
 Richland
 Ritchie

 Triadelphia
 Union
 Washington

 Webster

Pendleton County

Current

 Central

 Eastern

 Western

Historic

 Bethel
 Circleville

 Franklin
 Mill Run

 Sugar Grove
 Union

Pleasants County

Current

 District A
 District B

 District C

 District D

Historic

 Grant
 Jefferson

 Lafayette
 McKim

 Union
 Washington

Pocahontas County

 Edray
 Greenbank

 Huntersville

 Little Levels

Preston County

Current

 First
 Second

 Third
 Fourth

 Fifth

Historic

 Grant
 Kingwood
 Lyon

 Pleasant
 Portland
 Reno

 Union
 Valley

Putnam County

Current

 Buffalo-Union
 Curry

 Pocatalico
 Scott

 Teays

Historic

 Buffalo

 Union

Raleigh County

Current

 District 1

 District 2

 District 3

Historic

 Clear Fork
 Marsh Fork
 Richmond

 Shady Spring
 Slab Fork
 Town

 Trap Hill

Randolph County

 Beverly
 Dry Fork
 Huttonsville

 Leadsville
 Middle Fork
 Mingo

 New Interest
 Roaring Creek
 Valley Bend

Ritchie County

 Clay
 Grant

 Murphy

 Union

Roane County

Current

Eastern
Northern

Southern

Western

Historic

 Curtis
 Geary
 Harper

 Reedy
 Smithfield
 Spencer

 Walton

Summers County

Current

 Bluestone River

 Greenbrier River

 New River

Historic

 Forest Hill
 Greenbrier

 Green Sulphur
 Jumping Branch

 Pipestem
 Talcott

Taylor County

Current

 Eastern

 Tygart

 Western

Historic

 Booths Creek
 Court House

 Fetterman
 Flemington

 Grafton
 Knottsville

Tucker County

 Black Fork
 Clover
 Davis

 Dry Fork
 Fairfax
 Licking

 St. George

Tyler County

Current

 Central
 North

 South

 West

Historic

 Centreville
 Ellsworth

 Lincoln
 McElroy

 Meade
 Union

Upshur County

Current

 First

 Second

 Third

Historic

 Banks
 Buckhannon

 Meade
 Union

 Warren
 Washington

Wayne County

Current

 Butler
 Ceredo

 Stonewall
 Union

 Westmoreland

Historic

 Grant

 Lincoln

Webster County

Current

 Central

 Northern

 Southern

Historic

 Fork Lick
 Glade

 Hacker Valley

 Holly

Wetzel County

Current

 District 1

 District 2

 District 3

Historic

 Center
 Church
 Clay

 Grant
 Green
 Proctor

 Magnolia

Wirt County

Current

 Central

 Northeast

 Southwest

Historic

 Burning Springs
 Clay
 Elizabeth

 Newark
 Reedy
 Spring Creek

 Tucker

Wood County

 Clay
 Harris
 Lubeck

 Parkersburg
 Slate
 Steele

 Tygart
 Union
 Walker

 Williams

Wyoming County

Current

 District 1

 District 2

 District 3

Historic

 Baileysville
 Barkers Ridge
 Center

 Clear Fork
 Huff Creek
 Oceana

 Slab Fork

References

 
Magisterial districts